{{Infobox album
| name       = Shotgun Reality
| type       = studio
| artist     = Lahannya
| cover      = Shotgunreality.jpg
| alt        =
| released   = October 2007
| recorded   =
| venue      =
| studio     =
| genre      = Industrial Metal
| length     =
| label      = Kabuki
| producer   =
| prev_title = Drowning EP
| prev_year  = 2000
| next_title = Welcome To The Underground| next_year  = 2008
| misc       = 
}}Shotgun Reality''' is the debut album from female fronted industrial metal act, Lahannya.

Track listing
 Beautiful Girl – 3:33 
 Bleed For Me – 4:06 
 Narcotic – 3:46 
 Doors – 4:23 
 Wandering – 4:42 
 Rain – 3:51 
 Charades – 4:11 
 Losing Yourself – 5:11 
 Heaven – 3:52 
 Roundabouts – 4:08 
 Silent Victim – 4:36 
 Payback – 4:51

Lahannya albums
2007 albums